The Indiana University Dance Marathon, commonly known as IU Dance Marathon or IUDM, is a 36-hour Dance Marathon that takes place every November at Indiana University in Bloomington, Indiana, United States with the purpose of raising both funding and awareness for pediatric care. In 1991, student Jill Stewart started IU Dance Marathon in honor of her friend, Ryan White, who died from AIDS the year before. Since then, IUDM has raised over $50 million for Riley Hospital for Children in Indianapolis, IN, including most recently $3,233,968.23 during the 2022 marathon. The 2023 Indiana University Dance Marathon will take place November 10th through November 12th.

History

Ryan White

Ryan White's 1990 death was the inspiration for the creation of the Indiana University Dance Marathon in 1991. Thirteen-year-old Ryan White contracted AIDS from contaminated blood transfusions he received for hemophilia. When news of the contraction of AIDS became public, his school district in Kokomo, Indiana banned him from attending classes. Ryan then went on to fight in court which led to many headlines across the country and national celebrities like Michael Jackson and Elton John advocated on his behalf. Michael Jackson and Elton John befriended Ryan and helped to spread his story and awareness of AIDS.

After arduous court battles, Ryan won the right to return to school; but his battle with the community and AIDS had just begun. The White family dealt with adversity on a daily basis. People were not willing to deal with the concept of AIDS and shunned the Whites. They were victims of fear and anger but had an optimistic outlook that eventually things would return to normal. It was not until a bullet was shot into the White home that the family moved to Cicero, Indiana, where they found peace.

Ryan White was one of the biggest advocates of AIDS awareness, appearing at schools and fundraisers across the nation and testified in front of the President's Commission on HIV Epidemic in hopes of changing the public's perception of the disease.

On April 8, 1990, Ryan White died at the age of 18, right before he was to attend Indiana University. His strength and acceptance of disease helped those battling common illnesses continue to fight. Ryan's life is commemorated by the annual Dance Marathon funds and the Ryan White Infectious Disease Center at Riley Hospital.

Ashley Louise Crouse

On Tuesday, April 12, 2005, the Indiana University campus suffered a loss with the death of one of its students, Ashley Louise Crouse. Ashley was the Vice President of Communications for IUDM and a member of Kappa Kappa Gamma sorority. On her way home from an executive meeting, Ashley was struck and killed by a drunk driver outside the sorority house in which she lived, leaving behind a legacy of hope and passion that continues to live within each person involved in the organization.

Born and raised in Carmel, Indiana, Ashley's hometown joined with IUDM to create the most successful high school dance marathon in the country. In addition, along with Ryan White, the two are remembered by the thousands of IU students each year during a walk of remembrance each spring.

Riley Hospital for Children

Riley Hospital for Children, the recipient of the proceeds of the dance marathon, is a nationally ranked pediatric hospital located on the Indiana University School of Medicine's campus in Indianapolis, Indiana. It is one of the largest hospitals in the United States and treats over 80 percent of Hoosier children cancer patients. It continues to be among the best in the nation for its innovative research and unparalleled care. For the third year in a row, Riley Hospital has been ranked nationally in all 10 categories by U.S. News & World Report  and remains the only nationally ranked children's hospital in the state of Indiana.

The donations support Riley Hospital's mission to not turn away any child regardless of their family's financial status. It has more care-beds than any other children's hospital and treats over 150,000 patients a year. Riley Hospital for children holds Indiana's only children's burn center and dialysis center. It welcomes every type of patient and continues to enhance its cutting-edge care and facilities.

IUDM funded the Ryan White Infectious Disease Center which is housed in the Simon Family Tower, a 10-story, 675,000 sq. ft. inpatient center which opened on January 27, 2011. The infectious disease center is led by the Director and Professor of Clinical Pediatrics, Dr. John C. Christenson, MD, along with the Associate Professor of Clinical Pediatrics, Dr. Elaine G. Cox, MD. Ryan White's  doctor, Dr. Martin B. Kleiman, MD, continues to practice under infectious disease as the Ryan White Professor of Pediatrics.

Events

FT5K

The IUDM FT5K is a 5K run/walk that occurs the spring before the marathon and is located across from the Indiana University football stadium. Participation is open public-wide and prizes are awarded to the top three finishers. Following the race, entertainment and food are provided, as well as, time to spend with the Riley kids.

Road Rules

Road Rules is a bi-annual canning effort where IUDM committee members form teams of 3-5 on either a Saturday or Sunday morning and are given specific locations within central and southern Indiana, usually consisting of grocery stores, restaurants and walking trails.

A Walk to Remember

Each year, around the anniversary of both Ryan White and Ashley Louise Crouse's deaths, hundreds of students gather to walk in memory of the pairs passing. The walk starts at the Kappa Kappa Gamma house, where Crouse was a member, and continues around campus until ending up back at the Kappa house.

Fore the Kids Golf Outing

The IUDM Golf Outing is the main summer event and takes place at the River Glen Golf Club in Fishers, IN. Last year, the annual outing raised a record $31,000, surpassing 2012's total of $28,000. Individuals are encouraged to create teams to participate in the tournament in addition to a lunch and silent auction. To kick off the tournament, Riley patients and families are invited to share their story and encourage the golfers during their competition.

Runway Riley

Runway Riley is an annual fashion show co-sponsored by IU Dance Marathon and Phi Mu sorority. Not only does the event showcase the year's newest line of IUDM apparel for the first time to the public, but Riley kids and their families are featured as models of the clothing and merchandise. Immediately after the show, all apparel is available for purchase. Since its introduction in September 2012, Runway Riley has raised almost $30,000 for the kids at Riley Hospital for Children. The Riley kids get to feel like superstars in front of hundreds of cheering attendees.

Gala

The Gala, IUDM's largest singular fundraising event, is a formal event held in Indianapolis, Indiana every October. The Special Events committee host a dinner featuring speakers and both a silent and no-reserve auction This event raised nearly $100,000 in 2013.

Riley at the Rock

Each year, IUDM partners with Indiana University Athletics to host a pre-game tailgate featuring food, music, and games during which Riley children (over 60 in 2013) and their families spend time with IUDM participants. Following these pre-game festivities, the families and IUDM students enjoy the unique opportunity of running across the field immediately before the start of the game. Riley at the Rock provides an opportunity for the students to interact with children that have inspired them to participate in IUDM outside of the marathon.

IUDM Gives Back

IUDM Gives Back is an effort in which dance marathon committee members have the opportunity to give back to the Bloomington community through volunteer work. Committee members volunteer for various establishments including the Monroe County Community Kitchen, Boys & Girls Clubs of America, the Bloomington Community Orchard, and the WonderLab Museum of Science, Health & Technology.

For The Kicks

An annual event where IUDM partners with the Indiana Hoosiers men's soccer for a night of fun, leading up to the team's home game that night.

Marathon Weekend

IUDM 2013 Line Dance

The marathon takes place at the Indiana University Tennis Center, located on campus just north of Assembly Hall and Memorial Stadium, from Friday to Sunday one weekend in November. Those volunteering, or dancing, stand for 12, 24, or 36 hours in honor of those who cannot.

Before the event, all dancers participate in Color Wars fall semester long competition between 8 color teams that compete during the months leading up to the marathon and throughout the duration of the 36 hour dance marathon event. Dancer organizations are randomly divided into color teams and work together to earn points for their color by participating in weekly competitions, fundraising, 3 large-scale events, marathon stage games, and marathon participation. The winner of color wars for the year is announced at the marathon just before the raising of the total.

Committee members come together to set up, run the event and inspire others for the duration of the weekend. The marathon starts at 8 PM Friday night with dancers running into the gym to the song, "Eye of the Tiger." The executive council is then introduced and the dancers get to witness the famous IUDM Linedance for the first time. After the opening ceremonies, the teams are split up in a variety of stations around the center, including stations geared toward learning the linedance, hospitality and sports activities.

At certain times all teams and committee members come together to hear artist and speakers perform, participate in activities on stage and listen to Riley stories. Every year, IUDM has many visitors during the duration of the marathon, including IU alumni, faculty and administration, donors, and most importantly, the Riley families. Everyone at the marathon gathers to meet and listen to dozens of Riley children tell their stories. Each Riley kid walks down a red carpet, through the crowd, and up onto the stage, as each participant cheers them onward. During theirs presentations, the room falls silent and everyone uses this moment as a reminder of why they are standing.

As the marathon comes to a conclusion, the presidential address is given and all participants gather to remember those to which they stand for. Finally, the total is raised officially marking the end of the marathon and showing the hard work put in by thousands over the course of the year.

Organization Structure

See also
Riley Hospital for Children
Riley Children's Foundation
Children's Miracle Network
Ryan White
Indiana University - Bloomington
Dance Marathon
Dance in the United States

References

External links
 IUDM
 Indiana University-Bloomington
 Riley Children's Health
 Riley Children's Foundation
 Children's Miracle Network

Indiana University
Charity events in the United States
1991 establishments in Indiana
Recurring events established in 1991